The Hamburg oil field is a remote area in north-western Alberta, Canada, with intensive exploration and production of oil and gas.

The closest town is Manning, at 180 km east.

Drilling activity is especially intensive during the winter months, when the otherwise soft muskeg can be crossed on winter roads. 

Among the companies that have a large interest in the area are Devon Energy, APA Corporation, and Occidental Petroleum.

Access
West on the Chinhchaga Forestry Road from Highway 35
Through the Hamburg Aerodrome

See also
Canadian oil patch

Clear Hills County
Oil fields of Alberta